Dithiin  is a class of heterocyclic compounds, with the parent members having the formula (C2H2)2S2.  Two isomers of this parent are recognized, 1,2- and 1,4-dithiins.  Planar dithiins are 8π e− systems, which would lead to antiaromaticity if the structure was planar. Akin to the behavior of cyclooctatetraene, they instead adopt nonplanar structures. Vinyldithiin, a common component of garlic, is a misnomer for 3-vinyl-4H-1,2-dithiin. 1,3-dithiins are unknown.

1,4-Dithiins
1,4-Dithiins have been more extensively studied.  They are usually prepared by condensation of the equivalent of α-mercaptocarbonyls.  For example, the acetal HSCH2CH(OEt)2 converts upon heating to the parent 1,4-dithiin.  They are nonplanar and can be oxidized to their radical cations.  Photolysis leads to dimerization via a [2+2] cycloaddition.  Thianthrene is dibenzo-1,4-dithiin.

1,2-Dithiins
1,2-Dithiins are isomers of but-2-ene-dithials. They tend to be unstable with respect to loss of sulfur and formation of the thiophene derivative:
C4R4S2  →   C4R4S  +  "S"
They are often claret-colored.  Some occur as flower pigments in plants of the family Asteraceae.

References

Organosulfur compounds
Antiaromatic compounds